"Light My Fire" is a song by The Doors, from their debut album The Doors, which has also been released under the name Light My Fire.

Light My Fire may also refer to:

Music
 Light My Fire (Bob Thiele and Gábor Szabó album), 1967
 Light My Fire (Baccara album), 1978
 Light My Fire (Eliane Elias album), 2013
 "Light My Fire" (Club House song), 1993
 "Light My Fire" (Boom Boom Satellites song), 2003
 "Light My Fire" (Kotoko song), 2011
 "Light My Fire", Mr. Capone-E 2009 track on Diary of a G ft. Snoop Dogg
 Light My Fire: A Classic Rock Salute to The Doors, a 2014 tribute album

Books
 Light My Fire (book), a 1998 memoir by The Doors' keyboard player Ray Manzarek

See also
 "Relight My Fire"